Jennifer Lynn Schmidgall-Potter (born January 12, 1979) is an American ice hockey player. She is a member of the United States women's national ice hockey team. She won a gold medal at the 1998 Winter Olympics, silver medals at the 2002 Winter Olympics and 2010 Winter Olympics, and a bronze medal at the 2006 Winter Olympics. After, she plays for the Minnesota Whitecaps of the Western Women's Hockey League, where she won the league championship and was named MVP for the 2008–09 season. She was selected to the 2010 US Olympic team and was the only mother on the team.

Playing career

NCAA
Her NCAA career included three years at the University of Minnesota Duluth, and one year at the University of Minnesota. Potter set an NCAA record (since tied) for most goals in one game with 6. This was accomplished on December 18, 2002 versus St. Cloud State. Potter is the all-time leading scorer in Bulldogs history and was named to the WCHA All-Decade team in 2009. She was a four-time All-American. On January 21, 2011, Jenny Potter, along with Bulldog alumni Caroline Ouellette and Maria Rooth took part in a ceremonial faceoff to mark the first ever game at Amsoil Arena.

Team USA
Schmidgall-Potter has been on the US Women’s team since 1997, competing at three Winter Olympics, and at seven World Championships, winning gold medals in 2005, 2008, and 2009, and four silver medals in 1999, 2001, 2004, and 2007. As a 19-year-old, Schmidgall-Potter was the second youngest player on the 1998 U.S. Olympic Team. In 1999, she led the U.S. in scoring at the IIHF Women’s World Championships with 12 points in five games as the U.S. won the Silver Medal. By winning the silver medal at the 2010 Olympics, Potter became the most decorated Olympic medalist in Minnesota-Duluth Bulldogs hockey history.

Professional hockey

Minnesota Whitecaps
With the Minnesota Whitecaps, Potter was part of the first US based team to win the Clarkson Cup. With the Clarkson Cup victory, Potter became an unofficial member of the Triple Gold Club (women are not yet recognized by the IIHF), as she became one of only three women to win the Clarkson Cup, a gold medal in ice hockey at the 1998 Winter Olympics, and a gold medal at the IIHF women's world hockey championships.

Boston Blades
In the summer of 2014, Potter was selected in the first round of the 2014 CWHL Draft to the Boston Blades. She played less than a full season for the Blades, while juggling coaching duties at Trinity College.

Coaching career
In the summer of 2013 she was named head coach of the women's hockey team at Trinity College and retained that position for two seasons.

NCAA
In spring 2015, Potter was named the third head coach in the history of the Ohio State Buckeyes women's ice hockey program, replacing Nate Hanrahan. She was released from the program in August 2016.

Career stats

WWHL

Awards and honors
Directorate Award, Best Forward, 1999 IIHF Women's World Hockey Championships
Western Collegiate Hockey Association (WCHA) Player of the Year, 2000
All-WCHA First Team, 2000
Led NCAA in scoring, 2000, (41 goals, 52 assists, 93 points) 
WCHA Team of the Decade (2000’s) 
Vancouver 2010 Olympics, Media All-Star Team
Triple Gold Club (unofficial)
2010 USA Hockey Women's Player of the Year Award  (also known as the Bob Allen Women's Player of the Year award)

Personal 
Schmidgall-Potter was married in 2001 and is now a mother of 2. She took off the 2000–2001 season to give birth to her first child, daughter Madison. She delivered her second child, son Cullen in 2007. Jenny Schmidgall-Potter is from Edina High School in Minnesota. With her husband, Rob Potter, she runs a summer training camp called "Potter’s Pure Hockey."

References

External links
U.S. Olympic Team bio

1979 births
American women's ice hockey forwards
Boston Blades players
Clarkson Cup champions
Ice hockey players from Minnesota
Ice hockey players at the 1998 Winter Olympics
Ice hockey players at the 2002 Winter Olympics
Ice hockey players at the 2006 Winter Olympics
Ice hockey players at the 2010 Winter Olympics
Living people
Medalists at the 1998 Winter Olympics
Medalists at the 2002 Winter Olympics
Medalists at the 2006 Winter Olympics
Medalists at the 2010 Winter Olympics
Minnesota Duluth Bulldogs women's ice hockey players
Minnesota Golden Gophers women's ice hockey players
Minnesota Whitecaps players
Olympic bronze medalists for the United States in ice hockey
Olympic gold medalists for the United States in ice hockey
Olympic silver medalists for the United States in ice hockey
Sportspeople from Edina, Minnesota
Edina High School alumni
Ohio State Buckeyes women's ice hockey coaches